Wittrockia paulistana is a plant species in the genus Wittrockia. This species is endemic to Brazil.

The bromeliad is endemic to the Atlantic Forest biome (Mata Atlantica Brasileira) and to São Paulo (state), located in southeastern Brazil.

References

paulistana
Endemic flora of Brazil
Flora of São Paulo (state)
Flora of the Atlantic Forest